The Commissions and Independent Offices of the Kenya Government are created by Chapter 15 of the Constitution of Kenya or acts of Parliament

Constitutionally Independent

Commissions
The commissions are:

 Kenya National Human Rights Commission
 National Land Commission
 Independent Electoral and Boundaries Commission
 Parliamentary Service Commission
 Judicial Service Commission
 Commission on Revenue Allocation
 Public Service Commission
 Salaries and Remuneration Commission
 Teachers Service Commission
 National Police Service Commission
 Ethics and Anti-corruption Commission

Created by Acts of Parliament
The following independent commissions created by acts of parliament:
 Ethics and Anti-Corruption Commission
National Cohesion and Integration Commission
Independent Policing Oversight Authority

References

Politics of Kenya
Government agencies of Kenya
2012 in Kenya
Law of Kenya
Kenya articles by importance